Prasinada is a village in the municipality of Alexandreia, Imathia, Greece.

References

Populated places in Imathia